Allegheny University may refer to:

 Allegheny College
 Allegheny University of the Health Sciences